The 2018–19 Biathlon World Cup – Individual Women started on 6 December 2018 in Pokljuka and finished on 12 March 2019 in Östersund. It was won by Lisa Vittozzi of Italy.

Competition format
The individual race is the oldest biathlon event; the distance is skied over five laps. The biathlete shoots four times at any shooting lane, in the order of prone, standing, prone, standing, totalling 20 targets. Competitors' starts are staggered, normally by 30 seconds. The distance skied is usually 15 kilometres (9.3 mi) with a fixed penalty time of one minute per missed target that is added to the skiing time of the biathlete. In the "Short Individual" the distance is 12.5 kilometres (7.8 mi) with a penalty time of 45 seconds per missed target.

2017–18 Top 3 standings

Medal winners

Standings

References

Individual Women